Paulius is a Lithuanian masculine given name, which is a cognate of the name Paul, from the Latin Paulus, meaning "small" or "humble". The name may refer to:

Paulius Andrijauskas (born 1984), Lithuanian swimmer
Paulius Antanas Baltakis (1925–2019), Lithuanian Roman Catholic prelate
Paulius Dambrauskas (born 1991), Lithuanian basketball player 
Paulius Galaunė (1890–1988), Lithuanian art historian and artist
Paulius Golubickas (born 1999), Lithuanian footballer
Paulius Grybauskas (born 1984), Lithuanian footballer
Paulius Ivanauskas (born 1996), Lithuanian basketball player 
Paulius Jankūnas (born 1984), Lithuanian basketball player
Paulius Juodis (born 1978), Lithuanian basketball coach
Paulius Jurkus (1916–2004), Lithuanian painter
Paulius Paknys (born 1984), Lithuanian footballer
Paulius Petrilevičius (born 1991), Lithuanian basketball player
Paulius Pultinevičius (born 2001), Lithuanian chess player
Paulius Saudargas (born 1979), Lithuanian physicist and politician
Paulius Širvys (1920–1979), Lithuanian poet
Paulius Valinskas (born 1995), Lithuanian basketball player
Paulius Viktoravičius (born 1984), Lithuanian swimmer
Paulius Žalys (born 1995), Lithuanian basketball player

See also
Povilas

References

Lithuanian masculine given names